True Fantasy Live Online was an MMORPG in development by Level-5 for the Xbox. After a long and troubled development cycle that lasted almost two years, the game was cancelled on June 2, 2004. Available development and promotional information depict a massive fantasy setting in which up to 3,000 users—each with their own fully customizable character—can set out on adventures with one another, fighting monsters and collecting various items.

Cancellation
Despite being "fully playable" and near completion according to Microsoft around the time of its cancellation, the title's development was littered with complications from the beginning. One such problem was Level-5's inexperience with online network coding and their inability to properly implement voice chat compatibility into the game, a feature never before implemented on such a large scale in an MMORPG. However, Microsoft was very adamant on its inclusion, as it was a key feature to their Xbox Live service.

Relations between the two companies began to spiral out of control as Level-5 struggled to meet the demands required by Microsoft, who in turn grew frustrated at the lack of progress being made on the game. After a short showing at the Tokyo Game Show in 2003, True Fantasy Live Online was delayed from its initial Fall 2003 release into 2004. From then, little was seen or heard about the title, and after being absent from E3s 2004 convention, it was officially cancelled by Microsoft on June 3.

In the months following, Level-5 President and CEO Akihiro Hino stated in an interview that the poor relationship between his company and Microsoft, partially due to the latter's inexperience in dealing with Japanese developers, was one of the major reasons behind the game's cancellation. He implied that the two companies did not part amicably.

In a 2008 interview with Edge magazine, Shane Kim, former general manager of Microsoft Game Studios spoke in regard to failed Microsoft MMORPG projects, including True Fantasy Live Online.  While acknowledging that the cancellations were the right thing to do at the time, Kim also felt that such games could have been successful on the Xbox 360 platform.

References

External links
 Page on IGN.com
 First Look: True Fantasy Live Online
 True Fantasy Live Online Cancelled

Level-5 (company) games
Role-playing video games
Cancelled Xbox games
Massively multiplayer online role-playing games
Microsoft games